E4, E.IV or E-4 may refer to:

Entertainment
 E4 (TV channel), a digital television channel in the United Kingdom and Ireland
 Every Extend Extra Extreme, a video game from Q Entertainment
 Entertainment for All, a video game expo

Transportation
 Aero Asia International, an airline, by IATA code

Roads
 European route E4, a road through Finland and Sweden
 E4 European long distance path, a European long-distance trail
 Tōhoku Expressway, route E4 in Japan
 E4 expressway (Pakistan)
 South Kedah Expressway in Malaysia
 Subic Freeport Expressway in the Philippines

Trains
 E4 Series Shinkansen, a Japanese high-speed train
 CNW Class E-4, a 4-6-4 steam locomotive of the Chicago & Northwestern Railway
 EMC E4, a diesel locomotive
 LB&SCR E4 class, a steam locomotive of the London, Brighton & South Coast Railway
 LNER E4 Class, a 2-4-0 steam locomotive built by the Great Eastern Railway and operated by the LNER

Military
 Boeing E-4, a U.S. military flying command post
 Fokker E.IV, a 1915 German fighter aircraft
 E4, the fourth enlisted rank in the Military of the United States, including:
 Petty officer third class in the United States Navy and United States Coast Guard
 Senior airman in the United States Air Force (Sergeant until 1976)
 Specialist (rank) in the United States Army (if the soldier is not a non-commissioned officer)
 Corporal in the United States Army and United States Marine Corps (if the soldier is a non-commissioned officer)

Science and technology
 E4-isoprostane, a type of isoprostane
 Leukotriene E4, a naturally produced eicosanoid lipid mediator
 E-4 process, an obsolete development process associated with photographic transparency film
 Honda E4, a predecessor of Honda's ASIMO robot
 RCS-4, a synthetic cannabinoid sold as "E-4"
 E4 or E4, an old name for the exceptional group F4
 Estetrol, an estrogen

Other uses
 E4, a postcode district in the E postcode area
 King's Pawn Game, or 1. e4, a chess opening move
 E4 grade, a grade of difficulty in rock climbing
 E4 or E4, musical notation indicating the E above Middle C

See also
 EIV (disambiguation)